Charles Wilbert White, Jr. (April 2, 1918 – October 3, 1979) was an American artist known for his chronicling of African American related subjects in paintings, drawings, lithographs, and murals. White's lifelong commitment to chronicling the triumphs and struggles of his community in representational from, cemented him as one of the most well-known artists in African American art history. Following his death in 1979, White's work has been included in the permanent collections of the Art Institute of Chicago,  Los Angeles County Museum of Art, The Metropolitan Museum of Art, the Whitney Museum of American Art, The Newark Museum, and the Santa Barbara Museum of Art. White's best known work is The Contribution of the Negro to American Democracy, a mural at Hampton University. In 2018, the centenary year of his birth, the first major retrospective exhibition of his work was organized by the Art Institute of Chicago and the Museum of Modern Art.

Early life and education

Charles Wilbert White was born on April 2, 1918, to Ethelene Gary, a domestic worker, and Charles White Sr, a railroad and construction worker, on the South Side of Chicago. Ethelene was born in Mississippi and came north in the Great Migration. She raised Charles, and as she had no child care, she would often leave him at the public library. There White developed an affinity for art and reading at a young age. White's mother bought him a set of oil paints when he was seven years old, which hooked White on painting. White also played music as a child, studied modern dance, and was part of theatre groups; however, he stated that art was his true passion.

White's mother also took him to the Art Institute of Chicago, where he would read and look at paintings—developing a particular interest in the works of Winslow Homer and George Inness. Since White had little money growing up, he often painted on whatever surfaces he could find including shirts, cardboard, and window blinds.  During the Great Depression, young White tried to conceal his passion for art in fear of embarrassment; however, this ended when White got a job painting signs at the age of fourteen.  White learned how to mix paints by sitting-in every day for a week on an Art Institute sponsored painting class that was taking place at a park near his home. His mother remarried when White's father died in 1926. She married a steel mill worker who would become an abusive alcoholic, especially towards a young White. This experience lead him to escape into art. White had few opportunities to pursue his natural talent at this time due to the abuse and lack of resources from his household which was economically insufficient. This is also the same year his mother began sending him to Mississippi twice a year to his aunts, Hasty and Harriet Baines, where he would learn about his heritage and African American Southern folklore. White showed persistence while battling abuse and poverty. He used his own experiences, curiosity and feelings about the neglected history of African Americans to help shape a common theme within his work.  An early activist, as a teenager, he volunteered his talents and became the house artist at the National Negro Congress in Chicago. Later, in a union with fellow black artists, White was arrested while picketing.

White won a grant during the seventh grade to attend Saturday art classes at the Art Institute of Chicago. After reading Alain Locke's book The New Negro: An Interpretation, a critique of the Harlem Renaissance, White's social views changed. He learned after reading Locke's text about important African American figures in American history, and questioned his teachers on why they were not taught to students in school, causing some to label him a "rebel problematic child". White did not graduate from high school, having lost a year due to his refusal to attend class after being disillusioned with the teaching system. While he was encouraged by his art teachers to submit his art works and won various scholarships, these would later be taken away from him as an "error" and given to whites instead. He was admitted to two art schools, each then pulled his acceptance because of his race.

White ultimately received a full scholarship to attend the School of the Art Institute of Chicago. While there, White identified Mitchell Siporin, Francis Chapin, and Aaron Bohrod as his influences. He was an excellent draftsman, completing five drawing courses and received a final "A grade". To pay the costs of art supplies, White became a cook, using his mother's instruction and recipes. White later became an art teacher at St. Elizabeth Catholic High School.

Career
In 1940, White stated in an interview, "I am interested in the social, even the propagandistic angle of painting that will say what I have to say. Paint is the only weapon I have with which to fight what I resent." In 1938, White was hired by the Illinois Art Project, a state affiliate of the Works Progress Administration. His work received an extended showing at the Chicago Coliseum during the Exhibition of the Art of the American Negro, which was part of the American Negro Exposition commemorating the 75th anniversary of Thirteenth Amendment ending slavery. An important figure in what became known as the Chicago Black Renaissance, White taught art classes at the Southside Community Art Center. Following his first show at Paragon Studios in Cincinnati in 1938, White's work was exhibited widely throughout the United States, including, among many others, exhibitions at the Roko Gallery, the Boston Museum of Fine Arts, and the Whitney Museum of American Art. In 1939 he produced his WPA mural Five Great American Negroes, now at Howard University Gallery of Art. White also showed at the Palace of Culture in Warsaw and the Pushkin Museum. In 1976 his work was featured in Two Centuries of Black American Art, LACMA's first exhibition devoted exclusively to African-American Artists.

White moved to New Orleans in 1941 to teach at Dillard University. Beginning in that year, he was married briefly to famed sculptor and printmaker Elizabeth Catlett, who also taught at Dillard. He served in the US Army during WWII, but was discharged when he contracted tuberculosis (TB). White and Catlett moved to New York City and also studied together at an arts collective in Mexico City. While in New York City White learned lithography and etching techniques at the Arts Student League, taking direction from renowned artist Harry Sternberg who encouraged him to move beyond “stylization to individuation in his figures”.  It was here where White honed his technical skills and developed a more deepened vision of black society. White along with Catlett met a Jewish refugee from Nazi Germany named Viktor Lowenfeld who taught at Hampton Institute in Virginia. Lowenfeld invited the couple to teach at Hampton. Taking Sternberg advice to heart, White would go on to paint one of his most famous works, ''The Contribution of the Negro to American Democracy" at Hampton Institute.

Printmaking enabled White to reach a wider public more directly and allowed him to bring together his social commitment and artistic practice. Although he had long been aware of art’s social utility, with his lithographs and linocuts he was finally able to communicate with a large, cross-national community of black workers and socialist artists, as opposed to his paintings, which were generally tied to individual purchasers. He started providing political cartoons for the Daily Worker and, in 1953, he published in association with Masses and Mainstream a portfolio of six reproductions of his ink-and-charcoal drawings, entitled 'Charles White: Six Drawings'. Priced at only $3, this portfolio aimed at getting art to the people, a main concern for progressive artists of the period. In this respect it was a great success, and White himself acknowledged this as he learned that a group of workers in Alabama combined their savings to buy a portfolio and shared the pictures among themselves.

In 1956, due to continued breathing problems (perhaps arising from the earlier case of TB), White moved to Los Angeles for its drier, more mild climate. From 1965 to his death in 1979, White taught at the Otis Art Institute in Los Angeles. On faculty at Otis, he was a beacon for African American artists who came to study with him. Among those he taught were Alonzo Davis, David Hammons, and Kerry James Marshall. An elementary school was named after him and is located on the former Otis College campus. Later in life White moved to Altadena, California where he remained until his death of congestive heart failure in 1979.

White's best known work is the mural The Contribution of the Negro to American Democracy at Hampton University. Measuring around 12 feet by seven feet, the mural depicts a number of notable African-Americans including Denmark Vesey, Nat Turner, Peter Salem, George Washington Carver, Harriet Tubman, Frederick Douglass, and Marian Anderson. White was elected to the National Academy of Design in 1972.

Legacy 
White gained inspiration from many of his contemporaries including his first wife Elizabeth Catlett, Horace Pippin, Gordon Parks, Romare Bearden, Jacob Lawrence, Cliff Joseph, John Wilson, John Biggers, and others. White helped inspire the next generation of conscious black artists including the likes of Benny Andrews, Faith Ringgold, Dana Chandler, David Hammons, Elliot Pinkney, Alonzo Adams, Kyle Olani Adams and scores of others. White's works are in the collections of a number of institutions, including Atlanta University, the Barnett Aden Gallery, the Deutsche Academie der Kunste, the Dresden Museum of Art, Howard University, the Library of Congress, the Metropolitan Museum of Art, the Minneapolis Institute of Art, the Oakland Museum, the Smithsonian American Art Museum, the Nelson-Atkins Museum of Art, Syracuse University and the Virginia Museum of Fine Arts. The CEJJES Institute of Pomona, New York, owns a number of White's works and has established a dedicated Charles W. White Gallery. In 2015, Drs. Susan G. and Edmund W. Gordon of Pomona, New York  donated their collection of works by Charles White to the Blanton Museum of Art at the University of Texas, Austin.

White's popularity faded after his death both because he was a person of color in an industry that unfairly favored white artists and preferred more abstract and conceptual styles in direct opposition to White's style of figurative art. However White's popularity and legacy lives on in Altadena, California where he spent a great deal of his later years. Shortly after his death a park was re-named after him and it remains today the only park to be named after an American born artist. The Charles White Park hosted an annual event “Charles White Memorial Arts Festival” which brought African American and local artists into the community until its discontinuation in the 1990s. Currently members of the Altadena Arts council are working with local community and other stake holders to bring the event back to the community.

Reception
In 1982 a retrospective exhibition of White's work was held at the Studio Museum in Harlem.  In the 1990s, the idea of staging a major traveling retrospective exhibition arose. Ultimately, over approximately a ten year period, staff from the Art Institute of Chicago and the Museum of Modern Art attempted to locate various White pieces to put together an extensive exhibition of his work. The exhibition opened in Chicago in 2018, traveling to New York City and Los Angeles.

White "was a humanist, drawn to the physical body and more literal representations of the lives of African-Americans", according to Lauren Warnecke for the Chicago Tribune. While this put him out of step with the abstract movement in art, the power of his work is undeniable according to the Los Angeles Times Christopher Knight, especially White's graphic work in graphite, charcoal, crayon and ink.   The Washington Post art critic, Philip Kennicott finds White's work central to American art. "Grace, passion, coolness, toughness, [and] beauty"  mark White's work, according to Holland Cotter in The New York Times; White had "the hand of an angel" and "the eye of a sage".

In November 2019, two works by White went up for the first time in Christie's and Sotheby's main-seasonal New York City contemporary art  auctions.  Both works, Banner for Willie J. (1976) -- a portrait of White's cousin, who was killed—and Ye Shall Inherit the Earth (1953) -- a charcoal drawing of civil rights icon Rosa Lee Ingram with a babe-in-arms—made sales records for the artist's work.

References

Further reading

 
 
 (reviews from 1943 to 1976 that appeared in the paper)

External links
 Charles White in the collection of The Museum of Modern Art
 Charles White: A Retrospective
 Biographical Sketch
Charles White in the National Gallery of Australia's Kenneth Tyler Collection
Charles White in the Minneapolis Institute or Art, Minneapolis, MN

1918 births
1979 deaths
American muralists
Artists from Chicago
20th-century American painters
American male painters
Otis College of Art and Design faculty
School of the Art Institute of Chicago alumni
20th-century African-American painters
20th-century American male artists